Clambus pumilus, is a species of fringe-winged beetle endemic to Sri Lanka.

Description
This small species has a body length about 0.9 mm. Body shiny and reddish brown. Body pubescence is short and fine. Pronotum convex with smooth and shiny set with sparse, fine hairs. Elytra pubescence similar to that of pronotum. Abdominal sternites are transversely shagreened and finely pubescent.

References 

Scirtoidea
Insects of Sri Lanka
Beetles described in 1863